Grappin is a surname. Notable people with the surname include:

  (1881–1959), French linguist and grammarian
 Patrick Grappin (born 1955), French footballer and manager
 Sarah Grappin (born 1978), French actress